Hakon Ahlberg (June 10, 1891 – March 12, 1984) was a Swedish architect, editor, and author.

Biography
Hakon Claes Axel Ahlberg was born at Laholm in Halland County, Sweden.  He studied architecture at the Royal Institute of Technology in Stockholm, completing his studies in 1914. He also undertook studies at the Royal Swedish Academy of Arts in 1914–1917, one of his most influential teachers being Ivar Tengbom.
Ahlberg established his own office in 1917.
Ahlberg was best known as the official architect for the repair and restoration of Gripsholm Castle near the town of Mariefred in central Sweden. He was one of the founding members and first president of the Swedish Architects’ Association, and was well known as an active participant in architectural debate in Sweden, and was editor-in-chief of the Swedish architectural journals Arkitekten in 1922 and Byggmästaren  1922–24. He was also president of the Swedish Academy of Fine Arts 1954–62.

Ahlberg's principal role in Swedish architecture was not as a “leader of style” but as an idealistic leader, as an organiser and spokesman of the Swedish architectural profession.

As an architect he was part of the brief movement called Nordic Classicism, but with clear links with Swedish vernacular architecture, as expressed in the simple wooden houses he designed for the Swedish trade union-run folk high school (Brunnsviks folkhögskola) at  Brunnsvik  in  Ludvika parish during 1928. He designed a number of churches (e.g. Mälarhöjden Church, Stockholm, 1929), museums, and hospitals as well as housing. His most important works are the Arts and Crafts pavilion at the Gothenburg exhibition in 1923, and the PUB department store in central Stockholm from 1924. Ahlberg designed a number of hospitals, including the Sidsjön mental hospital in Sundsvall 1939–44, the Children's clinic in Oslo, Norway (1946–50), and the University Hospital in Maracaibo in Venezuela (1946–54).

In 1957 Ahlberg was awarded the Prince Eugen Medal and in 1973 the Alvar Aalto Medal.

Ahlberg's architectural office  closed in 1973. he died at Stockholm in  1984.

References and sources
References

Other Sources
 Nordic Classicsim 1910-1930, Museum of Finnish Architecture, Helsinki, 1982.
 Hakon Ahlberg, 'The Dilemma of Classicism', in Sigurd Lewerentz 1885-1975, Architectural Association Publications, London, 1989.
 Hakon Ahlberg,  'Alvar Aalto', in The Finnish Architectural Review, 7,8/ 1976. Arkkitehti, 7-8/1976
 E. Paulsson et al., Hakon Ahlberg, Arkitekt och Humanist. Byggforskningsrådet, Stockholm, 1994.

External links
 Swedish Association of Architects SAR 

1891 births
1984 deaths
Swedish architects
KTH Royal Institute of Technology alumni
Recipients of the Prince Eugen Medal